Klimash Passage (‘Protok Klimash’ \'pro-tok 'kli-mash\) is the 1.9 km wide passage in the South Shetland Islands between Table Island and Bowler Rocks on the northwest and Morris Rock and Chaos Reef, Aitcho Islands to the SE.  The area was visited by early 19th century sealers.

The passage is named after the settlement of Klimash in Southeastern Bulgaria.

Location
British mapping in 1968 and Bulgarian mapping in 2009.

Maps
 Livingston Island to King George Island.  Scale 1:200000.  Admiralty Nautical Chart 1776.  Taunton: UK Hydrographic Office, 1968.
 L.L. Ivanov. Antarctica: Livingston Island and Greenwich, Robert, Snow and Smith Islands. Scale 1:120000 topographic map. Troyan: Manfred Wörner Foundation, 2009.  (Second edition 2010)
Antarctic Digital Database (ADD). Scale 1:250000 topographic map of Antarctica. Scientific Committee on Antarctic Research (SCAR). Since 1993, regularly upgraded and updated.

References
 Bulgarian Antarctic Gazetteer. Antarctic Place-names Commission. (details in Bulgarian, basic data in English)
 Klimash Passage. SCAR Composite Antarctic Gazetteer.

External links
 Klimash Passage. Copernix satellite image

Bodies of water of Greenwich Island
Bulgaria and the Antarctic
Straits of the South Shetland Islands